Gestel is a commune in the Morbihan department of Brittany in north-western France. Inhabitants of Gestel are called in French Gestélois. Gestel station has rail connections to Quimper, Lorient and Vannes.

See also
Communes of the Morbihan department

References

External links

 Mayors of Morbihan Association 

Communes of Morbihan